The 2022 AMA National Speedway Championship Series was staged over three rounds, held at Bakersfield (June 25), Industry Hills (August 13) and Auburn, California (September 19).

The title was won by Billy Janniro, who beat defending champion Max Ruml. Janniro failed to win any round, with Ruml claiming all three, however he accumulated one more point throughout the series. Aaron Fox took third place to complete the podium.

It was the 11th time Janniro won the title, taking him three clear of Greg Hancock in the all-time rankings. It was also the fifth time Ruml had finished second.

Event format 
Over the course of 20 heats, each rider raced against every other rider once. The top eight scorers then reached the semi-finals, with first and second in those semi-finals reaching the final. Points were scored for every ride taken, including the semi-finals and final.

Final classification

References 

AMA
AMA National Speedway Championship
AMA
AMA